is a professional Japanese baseball player.

External links

1963 births
Living people
Baseball people from Hyōgo Prefecture
Japanese baseball players
Nippon Professional Baseball catchers
Yomiuri Giants players
Japanese baseball coaches
Nippon Professional Baseball coaches